The 1953 Northwestern Wildcats team represented Northwestern University during the 1953 Big Ten Conference football season. In their seventh year under head coach Bob Voigts, the Wildcats compiled a 3–6 record (0-6  against Big Ten Conference opponents), finished in last place in the Big Ten, and were outscored by their opponents by a combined total of 205 to 166.

Schedule

References

Northwestern
Northwestern Wildcats football seasons
Northwestern Wildcats football